Kim Bokamper (born September 25, 1954) is a former American football linebacker and defensive end who played his entire nine-year career with the National Football League (NFL)'s Miami Dolphins from 1977 to 1985.

Bokamper was drafted in the first round of the 1976 NFL Draft by the Dolphins after playing college football at San Jose State University. He was a member of the Dolphins' Killer B's defense of the early 1980s and was a one-time Pro Bowler in 1979.

Bokamper started at right defensive end for the Dolphins in Super Bowl XVII and Super Bowl XIX. Against the Washington Redskins in Super Bowl XVII, he was involved in a play in which he deflected a pass attempt from Redskins quarterback Joe Theismann, and nearly intercepted the deflected pass in the end zone, for a touchdown. Theismann was able to knock the ball away from Bokamper, preventing the interception.

After retirement Bokamper became a broadcaster at WFOR-TV in Miami.

Bokamper can be heard on South Florida's Paul and Young Ron Show on WBGG-Miami anytime NFL news breaks.
Bokamper was also part of the morning team on WQAM-AM along with Kenny Walker. In 2008, he hosted the weeknight Dolphins Tonight show on WQAM and opened a sports bar and restaurant in Plantation, Florida, called "Bokamper's Sports Bar & Grill". He has also opened Florida "Bokamper's Sports Bar & Grill" locations in Miramar, Estero, Naples and Fort Lauderdale.

Bokamper serves as the host of The Audible, a 30-minute program streamed live and via podcast from MiamiDolphins.com. On the program, Bokamper speaks with Dolphins personalities and gives viewers or listeners an inside look at the Dolphins team.

Bokamper's wife Colleen died in March 2014.

References

External links
 https://www.pro-football-reference.com/players/BokaKi00.htm

1954 births
Living people
American football linebackers
Concordia Cobbers football players
San Jose State Spartans football players
Miami Dolphins players
National Football League announcers
American Conference Pro Bowl players
Television anchors from Miami
People from Milpitas, California
American football defensive ends
Players of American football from San Diego